Catasto is the Italian system of land registration. The register itself is maintained at a local level by the individual councils or Comuni. The data held in the Catasto is the basis for the ICI council property tax (Imposta Comunale sugli Immobili).

There are several companies which offer easy search facilities to draw data from the various Italian local councils. This information can be used to understand the property holdings of individuals or companies and the charges (e.g. mortgages) which might be held over their ownership.

The Florentine Catasto of 1427 provided an important source of raw historical data for historians of the Renaissance. The extensive surveys conducted by Florentine officials reveal changing forms of social organization over the period that records were collected. David Herlihy and Christiane Klapisch-Zuber's work on these records, Tuscans and Their Families is one of the first historical works to make use of computer-assisted statistical analysis.

See also
 David Herlihy

External links
 Brown.edu: 1427 Catasto for the Republic of Florence, Italy (~10,000 records)
 Ancestry.com: 1754 Catasto Onciario for Marano Marchesato, Cosenza, Calabria region, Italy
 Oresteparise.it: 1753  Catasto Onciario for Cavallerizzo, Italy

Law of Italy
Real estate in Italy
Land registration
1427 establishments in Europe
15th-century establishments in the Republic of Florence

it:Catasto